Ivan George Lintin (born 17 August 1984) is a motorcycle racer from Bardney, Lincolnshire who regularly competed in the Isle of Man TT races.

Lintin suffered severe injuries during the 2018 Southern 100 road races in the Isle of Man involving another three riders, one of whom, James Cowton, died. Lintin required emergency treatment on the island subsequently followed by surgery and lengthy intensive care at Liverpool.

Lintin was a semi-professional racer and Retained firefighter. Two years after the injury was informed that he could return to the job.

In 2016, he scored his second win in the Lightweight TT.

In 2018 Lintin was leading the Lightweight TT race with a growing lead on his way to a third TT victory, when later in the race an engine failure brought retirement.  Michael Dunlop went on to claim his first win in that race category.

References

External links
Lintin in accident recovery therapy at Jubilee House Therapy Centre during 2019

Living people
English motorcycle racers
1984 births